"Animal" is a song recorded by English rock band Def Leppard in 1987 from the album Hysteria. It was the first single release off the album, and became the band's first Top 10 hit in their native UK, reaching No. 6 on the UK Singles Chart.

Recording 
"Animal" is usually noted by the band as having been the most difficult track to record for Hysteria. It was one of the first songs developed in early 1984, but neither the band nor successive producers Jim Steinman, Nigel Green and Robert John "Mutt" Lange were able to produce the desired sound until two and a half painstaking years later. It was the only Hysteria track demoed by Rick Allen on an acoustic drum kit prior to his car accident; the drummer having recorded a beat for the song on a four-track tape during early sessions. A later studio version, tracked to a drum machine, remained largely the same as the earlier demo, which the band felt was starting to sound dated, until Joe Elliot recorded a lead vocal over it in Paris in July 1985. Lange and the band were so impressed with that vocal that they rewrote and rerecorded the backing track around it.

The effort paid off when "Animal" was released as the lead single from the album in July 1987. In the UK, where the band had less success during the Pyromania era, the song hit #6 on the singles chart and broke Def Leppard into the pop mainstream across Europe. "When people saw us on Top of the Pops doing 'Animal'," remarked Elliot, "they heard a really great song that, style-wise, had more in common with INXS or U2, The Police with 'Roxanne'… And that was the band we wanted to be."

In America, the lead single "Women" performed poorly on the pop charts, which did not give much momentum when "Animal" was released afterwards in October 1987. The latter did however reach a respectable #19, beginning Leppard's run of ten consecutive U. S. Billboard Top 40 singles, and became one of the most enduringly popular numbers at Def Leppard concerts. The line "Like the restless rust, I never sleep" is a reference to Neil Young's album Rust Never Sleeps.

The single's UK B-side, "Tear It Down", was written during a recording session after the completion of the Hysteria album. The band laid down tracks intended as B-sides for the Hysteria singles; 'Tear It Down' itself received radio airplay. The band later rerecorded it for the Adrenalize album.

Track listing

7": Bludgeon Riffola / LEP1 (UK) 
On the back there is a picture of the band on some train rails. The photograph was taken by Laurie Lewis.

 "Animal"
 "Tear It Down"

12": Bludgeon Riffola / LEPX 1 (UK) 

 "Animal" (Extended Version)
 "Animal"
 "Tear It Down"

7": Mercury / PolyGram / 888-832-7 (US)
 "Animal"
 "I Wanna Be Your Hero"

Personnel

Def Leppard
Joe Elliott – lead vocals
Phil Collen – lead guitar, backing vocals
Steve Clark – rhythm guitar
Rick Savage – bass guitar,  backing vocals 
Rick Allen – drums

Charts

See also
List of glam metal albums and songs

References

1987 singles
Def Leppard songs
Mercury Records singles
Song recordings produced by Robert John "Mutt" Lange
Songs written by Joe Elliott
Songs written by Phil Collen
Songs written by Rick Savage
Songs written by Robert John "Mutt" Lange
Songs about animals